Woman in Distress is a 1937 American crime film directed by Lynn Shores and written by Albert DeMond. The film stars May Robson, Irene Hervey, Dean Jagger, Douglass Dumbrille, George McKay and Gene Morgan. The film was released on January 17, 1937, by Columbia Pictures.

Plot

Cast
May Robson as Phoebe Tuttle
Irene Hervey as Irene Donovan
Dean Jagger as Fred Stevens
Douglass Dumbrille as Jerome Culver
George McKay as Sergeant Casey
Gene Morgan as 'Slug' Bemis
Paul Fix as Joe Emory
Frank Sheridan as Inspector Roderick
Charles C. Wilson as Herbert Glaxton
Arthur Loft as Stewart Sadler
Wallis Clark as Mervyn Seymour

References

External links
 

1937 films
American crime films
1937 crime films
Columbia Pictures films
American black-and-white films
Films directed by Lynn Shores
1930s English-language films
1930s American films